The United States Department of Energy National Laboratories and Technology Centers is a system of laboratories overseen by the United States Department of Energy (DOE) for scientific and technological research. The primary mission of the DOE national laboratories is to conduct research and development (R&D) addressing national priorities: energy and climate, the environment, national security, and health. Sixteen of the seventeen DOE national laboratories are federally funded research and development centers administered, managed, operated and staffed by private-sector organizations under management and operating (M&O) contracts with the DOE.

The laboratories and their research mission 

The DOE is the nation's largest sponsor of research in the physical sciences and engineering, and is second to the Department of Defense in   supporting computer sciences and mathematics. Most of that research is performed by the national laboratories.

Although the national laboratories form an integrated system, each of them has its individual mission, capabilities, and structure. 
 The chart shows the nature of the research done at each laboratory. 

All 17 of the laboratories are listed below, along with the location, establishment date, and the organization that currently operates each.

National Scientific User Facilities 
The DOE Office of Science operates an extensive network of 28 national scientific user facilities. A total of over 30,000 scientific users from universities, national laboratories, and technology companies use these facilities to advance their research and development. The staff of experts at each facility who build and operate the associated instruments and work with visiting scientists to mount experiments with them. This access and support is provided without charge to qualified scientific groups, with priority based on recommendations by expert review panels. All six research offices support scientific user facilities at national laboratories.

History 

The system of national laboratories started with the massive scientific endeavors of World War II, in which several new technologies, especially the atomic bomb, proved decisive for the Allied victory. Though the United States government had begun seriously investing in scientific research for national security in World War I, it was only in this wartime period that significant resources were committed to scientific problems, under the auspices first of the National Defense Research Committee, and later the Office of Scientific Research and Development, organized and administered by  Vannevar Bush.

During the Second World War, centralized sites such as the Radiation Laboratory at MIT and Ernest O. Lawrence's laboratory at Berkeley and the Metallurgical Laboratory at the University of Chicago allowed for a large number of expert scientists to collaborate towards defined goals as never before, and with government resources of unprecedented scale at their disposal.

In the course of the war, the Allied nuclear effort, the Manhattan Project, created several secret sites for the purpose of bomb research and material development, including a laboratory in the mountains of New Mexico directed by Robert Oppenheimer (Los Alamos), and sites at Hanford, Washington and Oak Ridge, Tennessee. Hanford and Oak Ridge were administered by private companies, and Los Alamos was administered by a public university (the University of California). Additional success was had at the University of Chicago in reactor research, leading to the creation of Argonne National Laboratory outside Chicago, and at other academic institutions spread across the country.

After the war and its scientific successes, the newly created Atomic Energy Commission took over the future of the wartime laboratories, extending their lives indefinitely (they were originally thought of as temporary creations). Funding and infrastructure were secured to sponsor other "national laboratories" for both classified and basic research, especially in physics, with each national laboratory centered around one or many expensive machines (such as particle accelerators or nuclear reactors).

Most national laboratories maintained staffs of local researchers as well as allowing for visiting researchers to use their equipment, though priority to local or visiting researchers often varied from lab to lab. With their centralization of resources (both monetary and intellectual), the national labs serve as an exemplar for Big Science.

The national laboratory system, administered first by the Atomic Energy Commission, then the Energy Research and Development Administration, and currently the Department of Energy, is one of the largest (if not the largest) scientific research systems in the world. The DOE provides about a third of the total national funding for physics, chemistry, materials science, and other areas of the physical sciences.

List of other scientific facilities at DOE national laboratories

 Argonne Tandem Linear Accelerator System
 Combustion Research Facility
 Energy Systems Integration Facility
 Holifield Radioactive Ion Beam Facility
 Laboratory for Laser Energetics
 Los Alamos Neutron Science Center
 Manuel Lujan Jr. Neutron Scattering Center
 Materials Preparation Center
 National Ignition Facility
 National Transportation Research Center
 Radiochemical Engineering Development Center

In popular culture
 In the Netflix web series Stranger Things, a fictional laboratory called Hawkins National Laboratory run by the DOE is located in the fictional town of Hawkins, Indiana.
 In the AMC show Breaking Bad, Walter White works for Sandia National Laboratories prior to Season One.
 In the 2003 film The Hulk, a model of the Gamma Sphere, built at Lawrence Berkeley National Laboratory as a detector of gamma rays, is used as the powerful source of gamma rays. The Hulk ends up hurling it through the iconic dome of the Advanced Light Source, which was designed by Arthur Brown Jr. around 1940 for the 184-inch cyclotron.

References

Further reading 
 Westwick, Peter J. (2003). The National Labs: Science in an American System, 1947–1974. Cambridge: Harvard University Press. .

External links 

 Energy.gov: Department of Energy National Laboratories website
 Science.energy.gov: U.S. Department of Energy; Ten-Year Plans for the Office of Science's National Laboratories
 Energy.gov:  DOE Budget Page, with link to National Laboratories budgets

 
Laboratories in the United States
Energy research institutes
Department of Energy laboratories
Nuclear weapons program of the United States
Research institutes in the United States
United States Department of Energy facilities
Science and technology in the United States
United States Department of Energy